"The Planck Dive" is a science fiction novelette by Australian writer Greg Egan, published in 1998.  It was nominated for the 1999 Hugo Award for Best Novelette.

Plot summary
The story is set in the polis known as Cartan Null, where five explorers are preparing to send cloned copies of themselves on a scientific journey into a black hole.  As they are about to make the dive a biographer from Earth and his daughter arrive with intentions of writing their story.

See also
 Diaspora

References

External links
 The Planck Dive - freely downloadable from the author's website.
 

Science fiction short stories
1998 short stories
Works originally published in Asimov's Science Fiction
Short stories by Greg Egan
Fiction about black holes
Cloning in fiction